Antoine Huberty (c.1722 – 13 January 1791) was a French musician, music publisher, and engraver of Flemish origin who practiced in Paris and later in Vienna in the second half of the 18th century. His name is sometimes spelled Anton Huberty or Antoine Huberti.

Life 

Huberty worked in Paris from 1756 as a musician at the opera and viola d'amore player, but he remains better known for his activities as engraver and music publisher.

His first publications date from 1756 with works by Wagenseil. Between 1758 and 1760, he was briefly associated with La Chevardière, another important Parisian publisher. In Paris, in addition to Wagenseil, Huberty published Holzbauer, Wanhal, Benda, Franz Aspelmayr, Zappa, Anton Filtz, Pugnani, Sammartini, etc.

At some point, he was convinced to move to Vienna where copper engraving was little practiced at the time. He momentarily sold his shop to the publisher Sieber in 1771.

Huberty and his family moved to Vienna in the beginning of 1777 where he established his company in Alstergasse under the sign  [The golden deer]. However, unable to rival the competition from Torricella and Artaria, he did not open his own shop and worked for them: from 1781 he engraved for Torricella and later, increasingly for Artaria and other publishers. His engraver work is recognizable even without his mark, "Huberty sculps".

At the end of his life, Huberty was reduced to abject poverty and worked only on the technique of engraving plates that were used by Artaria, Hoffmeister and Kozeluch.

Bibliography 
 Alexander Weinmann, Kataloge Anton Huberty (Wien) und Christoph Torricella. Vienne, Universal Edition 1962,

References

See also 
 Répertoire international des sources musicales

1722 births
1791 deaths
French music publishers (people)
Music publishing companies of France
Viola d'amore players